Apara Mehta Jariwala (Mostly Known By Her Maiden Name Apara Mehta) is an Indian television  and Bollywood actress known for her supporting roles like Savita Mansukh Virani in the iconic show Kyunki Saas Bhi Kabhi Bahu Thi.

Now currently, she is seen in the show Sargam Ki Sadhe Satii which airs on Sony Set in which she is essaying the role of Ketki Awasthi the female protagonist Anjali Tatrari's mother in law and is screen sharing with her husband Darshan Jariwala after a long hiatus.

Personal life
In 1980 she married Indian television and film personality Darshan Jariwala, with whom she has one daughter. The two have separated now. Excerpts about their personal life were shown in the reality show Maa Exchange, which aired on Sony Entertainment Television.

Theatrical career
Mehta has worked on stage since 1981. She has acted in over 150 plays in various roles. She has found a constant career in plays.

Television career
 Apara started her television career anchoring a children's programme called Santakukdi for Mumbai Doordarshan at the age of 15.
 Her first major break was in Ek Mahal Ho Sapno Ka, in which she played Paro.
 This was followed by Kyunki Saas Bhi Kabhi Bahu Thi, in which she played Savita Mansukh Virani (mother-in-law of lead character Tulsi).
 She then appeared in a negative role as Kukki Kaaki in Saat Phere and other soaps like Parrivaar, Dhak Dhak In Dubai, Dillagi, Alpviram, Hum Hain Anari, Love Marriage and Chandan Ka Palna.
 She also did comedy roles in Sajan Re Jhoot Mat Bolo as Damini Devi Diwan, Golmaal Hai Bhai Sab Golmaal Hai as Pari on SAB TV and as Leela in  Hamari Saas Leela on Colors TV.
 She also played supporting roles in some Bollywood films.
 She played a role in Firangi Bahu on Colors TV.
 She used to appear in Tu Mere Agal Bagal Hai as Basundi on SAB TV.
 She worked
s on the weekend horror/thriller fiction show Qayamat Ki Raat on Star Plus as the main female protagonist's grand in 2018.o
She recently appeared in Yeh Rishta Kya Kehlata Hai, Bhabi Ji Ghar Par Hai and Sai-Shraddha aur Saburi
 She played as Manmita Chaddha in Choti Sarrdaarni and later appeared in Maddam Sir.

Television show
Alpviram
 Ek Mahal Ho Sapno Ka (1999)
 Kyunki Saas Bhi Kabhi Bahu Thi (2000–2008) As Savita Mansukh Virani
 Khichdi (2004) Guest Appearance
 Saat Phere as Kukki Kaki (2006)
 Karam Apnaa Apnaa (2006)
 Parrivaar (2007)
 Chandan ka palna aur resham ki dori as Kusum
 Dhak Dhak In Dubai (2007)
 Raja Ki Aayegi Baraat (2009)
 Sajan Re Jhoot Mat Bolo as Damini Devi Diwan (2009–2012)
 Hamari Saas Leela as Leela (2011)
 Kya Huaa Tera Vaada as Suhasi Alok Singh (2012–2013)
 Golmaal Hai Bhai Sab Golmaal Hai as Pari (2012)
 Firangi Bahu (Sahara One) (2013–2014)
 Jamai Raja as Nani (2014–2016)
 Tu Mere Agal Bagal Hai as Basundi (2014)
 Woh Teri Bhabhi Hai Pagle as Mrs. Dilwale on Sab TV (2016)
 Naya Mahisagar as Tiwari Mehta
 Brahmarakshas (TV series) as Jasmit/Jassi/Dadi Bua (2016)
 Bakula Bua Ka Bhoot on &TV as Rekha (2017)
 Qayamat Ki Raat as Madhuri Thakur (Gauri's paternal grandmother)
 Bhabhi ji Ghar Par Hai as Alpaa-episodic role (2018)
 Yeh Rishta Kya Kehlata Hai Cameo (2021)
 Indiawali Maa as Kesar Masi (2021)
 Sargam Ki Sadhe Satii as Ketki Awasthi née Mishra: Chedilal's wife, Purushottam's daughter, Sargam's mother in law and Aparshakti, Eklavya, Aastik, Asha Amar and Alaukik's mother (2021–present) on Sony Set .
 Choti Sarrdaarni as Manmita Chaddha (2021)
 Maddam Sir as Sarita Singh (2022)
 Jai Hanuman - Sankat Mochan Naam Tiharo (2022)

Filmography
 Yeh Teraa Ghar Yeh Meraa Ghar (2001) - Dayashankar's elder sister
 Chori Chori Chupke Chupke (2001) -  Prostitute
 Devdas (2002 Hindi film) (2002) - Badi Aapa
 Just Married (2007)
 Tees Maar Khan (2010) - Tabrez Mirza Khan's (Tees Maar Khan) mother

References

External links
 

Living people
1960 births
Gujarati people
Actresses in Hindi cinema
Indian television actresses
Indian film actresses
20th-century Indian actresses
21st-century Indian actresses
People from Bhavnagar
Bharatiya Janata Party politicians from Gujarat